Trudovoye (lit. labor) is a large rural locality (a village) under the administrative jurisdiction of Frunzensky City District of Vladivostok City Under Krai Jurisdiction in Primorsky Krai, Russia. Population:

History
It was established in 1890 and was granted urban-type settlement status in 1943. In December 2004, it was demoted in status back to that of a rural locality.

Economy
There is a brick-yard and several coal mines in the settlement.

Transportation
Trudovoye is also an important railway station on the Khabarovsk-Vladivostok line.

Demographics
As of the 2010 Census, Trudovoye is the most populated rural locality in both the Far Eastern Federal District of Russia and in Asian Russia.

References

Rural localities in Primorsky Krai